Bill Feuerborn was a Democratic member of the Kansas House of Representatives, representing the 5th district. He began his first term on June 4, 1994 and was defeated by Kevin Jones in 2012.

Prior to his election, Feuerborn served on the USD 365 School Board for four years, including serving as president in 1993.  He has owned his own business and been involved in the business sector for over 35 years.

He has been married to his wife Lynda for 32 years.  They have three children and five grandchildren.

Committee membership
 Appropriations (Ranking Member)
 Vision 2020
 Education Budget
 Joint Committee on Special Claims Against the State
 Joint Committee on State Building Construction.

Major donors
The top 5 donors to Feuerborn's 2008 campaign were all professional associations:
1. Kansas National Education Assoc 	$1,000
2. Kansas Contractors Assoc 	$1,000
3. Kansas Bankers Assoc 	$800
4. Kansas Medical Society 	$750
5. Kansas Livestock Assoc 	$750

References

External links
 Kansas Legislature - Bill Feuerborn
 Project Vote Smart profile
 Kansas Votes profile
 State Surge - Legislative Effectiveness Profile
 Follow the Money campaign contributions:
 1996,1998,2000,2002, 2004, 2006, 2008

Democratic Party members of the Kansas House of Representatives
Living people
20th-century American politicians
21st-century American politicians
1948 births